Delron Felix (born 20 October 2000) is a Grenadian swimmer. He competed in the men's 100 metre freestyle at the 2020 Summer Olympics.

References

External links
 

2000 births
Living people
Grenadian male swimmers
Grenadian male freestyle swimmers
Olympic swimmers of Grenada
Swimmers at the 2020 Summer Olympics
Place of birth missing (living people)
Pan American Games competitors for Grenada
Swimmers at the 2019 Pan American Games
Swimmers at the 2018 Summer Youth Olympics